Epermenia sinjovi is a moth of the family Epermeniidae. It is found in the Russian Far East (southern Primor’je, Kamchatka), south-eastern Siberia, the southern Kuril islands, the Baikal region (Burjatija) and Japan (Hokkaido, Honshu).

The length of the forewings is 5–6 mm. Adults are variable, with four described colour forms.

The larvae feed on Angelica species, including Angelica pubescens and Angelica ursina.

References

Moths described in 1993
Epermeniidae
Moths of Japan
Moths of Asia